An outdoor bronze sculpture depicting U.S. Congressman John Watts by George Edwin Bissell is installed in the Trinity Church Cemetery outside Manhattan's Trinity Church, in the U.S. state of New York. It was erected by Watt's grandson, John Watts de Peyster, in 1893.

See also

 1893 in art

References

External links
 
 

1893 establishments in New York (state)
1893 sculptures
Bronze sculptures in Manhattan
Financial District, Manhattan
Monuments and memorials in Manhattan
Outdoor sculptures in Manhattan
Sculptures of men in New York City
Statues in New York City